For articles on Irish television in the 2000s please see:
2000 in Irish television
2001 in Irish television
2002 in Irish television
2003 in Irish television
2004 in Irish television
2005 in Irish television
2006 in Irish television
2007 in Irish television
2008 in Irish television
2009 in Irish television

 
Television in Ireland